Thomas Pollock Low (3 October 1874 – 11 December 1938) was a Scottish footballer who played for Parkhead, Rangers (two spells, winning the Scottish Cup, Glasgow Cup and Glasgow Merchants Charity Cup in 1896–97), Dundee, Woolwich Arsenal, Falkirk, Abercorn (following a period out of the game due to a registration issue), Dunfermline Athletic, Morton and Scotland (one cap, 1897).

He was the brother of fellow Scottish international footballer James Low.

References

Sources

External links

London Hearts profile (Scotland)
London Hearts profile (Scottish League)

1874 births
1938 deaths
Association football outside forwards
Sportspeople from Cambuslang
Scottish footballers
Scotland international footballers
Parkhead F.C. players
Rangers F.C. players
Dundee F.C. players
Cambuslang Hibernian F.C. players
Dunfermline Athletic F.C. players
Falkirk F.C. players
Arsenal F.C. players
Abercorn F.C. players
Greenock Morton F.C. players
Scottish Football League players
English Football League players
Scottish Football League representative players
Scottish Junior Football Association players
Scotland junior international footballers
Scottish emigrants to the United States
Footballers from South Lanarkshire